Gollijeh-ye Sofla (also Romanized as Gollījeh-ye Soflá; also known as Goljeh, Gollījeh, Gulūjab, Gyul’dzya, and Kolūcheh) is a village in Bonab Rural District, in the Central District of Zanjan County, Zanjan Province, Iran. At the 2006 census, its population was 280, in 57 families.

References 

Populated places in Zanjan County